North Carolina's 7th House district is one of 120 districts in the North Carolina House of Representatives. It has been represented by Republican Matthew Winslow since 2021.

Geography
Since 2023, the district has included all of Franklin County, as well as part of Granville County. The district overlaps with the 11th and 18th Senate districts.

District officeholders since 1983

Election results

2022

2020

2018

2016

2014

2012

2010

2008

2006

2004

2002

2000

References

North Carolina House districts
Franklin County, North Carolina
Granville County, North Carolina